Agromyces tropicus is a bacterium from the genus of Agromyces which has been isolated from soil from the Chiang Mai Province in Thailand.

References 

Microbacteriaceae
Bacteria described in 2011